The 2013 Atlantic 10 Conference baseball tournament was the postseason baseball tournament of the NCAA Division I Atlantic 10 Conference.  It took place from May 22 through 25.  The top seven regular season finishers of the league's fifteen teams met in the double-elimination tournament to be held at newly renovated Robert and Mariam Hayes Stadium on the campus of the University of North Carolina at Charlotte in Charlotte, North Carolina.  In the championship game, first-seeded Saint Louis defeated second-seeded Charlotte, 7-4, to win its third tournament championship (its second under head coach Darin Hendrickson).  Saint Louis earned the conference's automatic bid to the 2013 NCAA Division I baseball tournament. As a team, SLU collected 92 hits in six days (.395 average), shattering the previous A-10 Tournament record of 65.

Seeding and format
In an expansion from previous years, the top seven finishers from the regular season were seeded one through seven.  The top seed received a single bye while remaining seeds played on the first day.

Bracket

All-Tournament Team
The following players were named to the All-Tournament Team.

Most Valuable Player
Alex Kelly was named Tournament Most Valuable Player.  Kelly was a senior outfielder for Saint Louis who set tournament records for hits (12) and RBI (13).

References

Tournament
Atlantic 10 Conference Baseball Tournament
Atlantic 10 Conference baseball tournament
Atlantic 10 Conference baseball tournament
College baseball tournaments in North Carolina
Baseball competitions in Charlotte, North Carolina